The Santahar–Kaunia line is a dual-gauge railway line connecting Santahar and Kaunia in Bangladesh, under the jurisdiction of Bangladesh Railway. From 1878 to 2010 it was a single line of metre gauge . Between 2010 and 2013, Bangladesh Railway converted the track to also include a  line, with help of Indian Railways.

History

The Brahmaputra–Sultanpur Railway Company constructed the  metre-gauge railway track from Santahar to Fulchhari (Tistamukh) in 1899–1900. Presently the line is up to Balashi Ghat in Phulchhari Upazila. The  Bonarpara–Kaunia line was constructed in 1905.

Assam Mail

The prestigious Assam Mail originally ran along this track in the British days from Santahar to Amingaon.

Ferry
In Bangladesh, ferries are often an integrated part of the railway system. There were two major ferry points across the Jamuna, one between Bahadurabad Ghat and Tistamukh Ghat and the other between Jagannath Ghat and Sirajganj Ghat.

The ferry system had reached the limits of its capacity. While marginal capacity additions
were still feasible, to cope with any significant increase in capacity or even normal traffic growth was virtually felt to be impossible.

The construction of the  Bangabandhu Bridge has completely changed the scope of communication systems in that part of the country. The ferry system at both the Bahadurabad Ghat–Balashi Ghat and the Jagannathganj Ghat–Sirajganj Ghat was virtually closed. Only limited freight transportation continued on the Bahadurabad Ghat–Balashi section. Even that has been closed down in 2010 because of formation of shoal in the river.

References

Railway lines opened in 1878
Metre gauge railways in Bangladesh